The Wicked Winter Renaissance Faire, which ran for 3 days every February from 2006 to 2016 (and a reborn event in 2018), was a yearly adult-themed fair with programming geared towards ages 16 and up. It was founded by Jeff Mach.

Description 
The Wicked Winter Renaissance Faire was an indoor renaissance festival for ages 16 and up. The event started with Renaissance-themed programming, but later expanded to include additional themes including Steampunk, Gothic, Burlesque shows, Pirates, Ninjas, Fairtales, and Villans. An adult section was also added in the early years.

History 
Wicked Faire was an event organizaed and put on my Widdershins, LLC DBA Wicked Events.  The first Wicked Faire was held in February 2006 at the New Jersey Convention and Expo Center.

In 2013, the Wicked Winter Renaissance Faire was the largest indoor Renaissance Faire in the world.

The 2016 edition of the Wicked Winter Renaissance Faire was announced to be the last one, founder Jeff Mach explaining that the Faire reached maturity and that the event had lost its novelty spark. 

In 2017, Jeff Mach launched the Glimmerdark festival in Princeton, which was presented as the successor of the Wicked Winter Renaissance Faire. Jeff Mach said the Glimmerdark festival retained the best elements of the Wicked Winter Renaissance Faire. 

Tammy Shipps, president of Silver Phoenix, purchased the intellectual rights of the Wicked Winter Renaissance Faire on 13 March 2018 and renamed JME from Jeff Mach Events to Just Magical Events.  Wicked Faire 2018 was funded by a buyout from Turtle Hill Events.

What Happened to the Founder 
In 2018, Jeff Mach fell victim of the Me Too movement when allegations of sexual harassment were posted on social media and gathered on an anonymous Blogspot blog called Owl Eye View. Four persons revealed those facts on record to the Daily Beast, and others did it directly on social media. Allegations included one person said she was forced by Jeff Mach to take sleeping medication, consent violations, offering of sexual favors, and BDSM practices that may or may not have been consented to.

References

External links
Archived (03/03/2018) official website

Renaissance fairs
Tourist attractions in Somerset County, New Jersey
Festivals in New Jersey